Nicole Hernández Hammer ( Hernández Estrada) is a Guatemalan-American climate scientist and activist studying sea level rise and the disproportionate impacts of climate change on communities of color. She is a climate advocate for the Union of Concerned Scientists and former deputy director of the Florida Center for Environmental Studies.

Early life and education
Nicole Hernández was born to Óscar Hernández and Maria Eugenia Estrada Nicolle, in Guatemala. Her father is a pulmonologist of Cuban heritage, and her mother, who died in 2017, was Guatemalan. She has two brothers, one of whom is actor Oscar Isaac. At the age of four, her family migrated to the United States. The family lived in various states before settling in Florida. When Hammer was an infant, her family experienced a substantial earthquake and when she was a teenager in 1992, Hurricane Andrew destroyed the family's home in Miami; as a result, she and her family lost everything. She earned her bachelor's degree in integrated natural sciences from the University of South Florida, as well as an M.S. in biology from Florida Atlantic University, and an MBA from Palm Beach Atlantic University.

Research and career

Research
Hammer's research is focused on how climate change is affecting communities of color and low-income communities. Hammer made the connection that Latino populations are very vulnerable to sea level rise compared to other populations. With this information, she was determined to spread the message through outreach and further research. In 2013, Hammer was a part of the Climate Assessment of Southeast US to further assess the damage of infrastructure due to sea level rise.

Public outreach
Over the years, she has done many interviews and publications on the effects of sea level rise on communities of color. Hammer is directly involved in outreach to the general public; she regrets not taking more psychology courses in college because her work entails explaining the complexities of climate change to ordinary people. Her work has been discussed in outlets including The New York Times, The Washington Post, The New Yorker, NBC, National Geographic, and NPR. In 2015, Hammer presented then-Governor Rick Scott a report on climate change's effects in Florida yet she was allegedly instructed by his administration to remove all mention of climate change (which he denies). In 2016, Hammer attended the Climate March and spoke to several news networks on how important research funding from the government is for tracking the changes of the earth from climate change. She was also on a panel for Amy Poehler's Smart Girls where she talked about the disproportionate impacts of climate change on communities of color. In general, she communicates on how important it is for the government to become involved in combating climate change for future generations.

Additionally, Hammer has done outreach in the political sphere as well. She spoke at the Democratic National Convention in June 2016, on how climate change is an immediate concern for the country through the effects of rising sea levels on vulnerable Latino communities. She communicated direct immediate actions the government can take to relieve the stresses of rising sea levels and pollution on Latino communities.

Her public outreach also extends to Latino communities to make climate change information more accessible to those who need it most. While working at Moms Clean Air Force, she worked to develop Spanish outreach materials on climate change so that individuals can arm themselves with information they need to protect themselves. Additionally, while working at the Union of Concerned Scientists, a nonprofit that informs people about climate change, she led climate change adaptation projects for not only Latino communities but all communities. Her goal is to help to inform Latino voters on issues of climate change and empower them to talk to their local officials.

Honors and awards
In 2015, Hammer was invited to the State of the Union Address by First Lady Michelle Obama to spread awareness about climate change and its effects on communities of color.

Personal life 
Hammer now lives in Rhode Island. She and her husband have a son. Hammer credits her mother for instilling in her the need to protect the environment.

See also 

 Emily Cunningham
 Julia Butterfly Hill
 Abigail Borah

References

External links

American people of Guatemalan descent
Florida Atlantic University alumni
Palm Beach Atlantic University alumni
University of South Florida alumni
American climatologists
Women climatologists
American women environmentalists
American environmentalists
Guatemalan people of Cuban descent
Florida Democrats
Living people
Year of birth missing (living people)